Microaggression is a term used for commonplace daily verbal, behavioral or environmental slights, whether intentional or unintentional, that communicate hostile, derogatory, or negative attitudes toward stigmatized or culturally marginalized groups. The term was coined by Harvard University psychiatrist Chester M. Pierce in 1970 to describe insults and dismissals which he regularly witnessed non-black Americans inflicting on African Americans. By the early 21st century, use of the term was applied to the casual degradation of any socially marginalized group, including LGBT people, poor people, and disabled people. Psychologist Derald Wing Sue defines microaggressions as "brief, everyday exchanges that send denigrating messages to certain individuals because of their group membership". The persons making the comments may be otherwise well-intentioned and unaware of the potential impact of their words.

A number of scholars and social commentators have criticized the microaggression concept for its lack of scientific basis, over-reliance on subjective evidence, and promotion of psychological fragility. Critics argue that avoiding behaviors that one interprets as microaggressions restricts one's own freedom and causes emotional self-harm, and that employing authority figures to address microaggressions (i.e call-out culture) can lead to an atrophy of those skills needed to mediate one's own disputes. Some argue that, because the term "microaggression" uses language connoting violence to describe verbal conduct, it can be abused to exaggerate harm, resulting in retribution and the elevation of victimhood.

D. W. Sue, who popularized the term microaggressions, has expressed doubts on how the concept is being used: "I was concerned that people who use these examples would take them out of context and use them as a punitive rather than an exemplary way."  In the 2020 edition of his book with Lisa Spanierman and in a 2021 book with his doctoral students, Dr. Sue introduces the idea of "microinterventions" as potential solutions to acts of microaggression.

Description 
Microaggressions are common, everyday slights and comments that relate to various aspects of one’s appearance or identity such as class, gender, body shape, sex, race, ethnicity, or age, among others.
They are thought to spring from unconsciously held prejudices and beliefs which may be demonstrated consciously or unconsciously through daily verbal interactions. Although these communications typically appear harmless to observers, they are considered a form of covert racism or everyday discrimination. Microaggressions differ from what Pierce referred to as "macroaggressions", which are more extreme forms of racism (such as lynchings or beatings) due to their ambiguity, size and commonality. Microaggressions are experienced by most stigmatized individuals and occur on a regular basis. These can be particularly stressful for people on the receiving end as they are easily denied by those committing them. They are also harder to detect by members of the dominant culture, as they are often unaware they are causing harm. Sue describes microaggressions as including statements that repeat or affirm stereotypes about the minority group or subtly demean its members.

Categories 
In conducting two focus groups with Asian-Americans, for instance, Sue proposed eight distinct themes of racial microaggression:

Alien in own land: When people assume people of color are foreigners.
 E.g.: "So where are you really from?" or "Why don't you have an accent?"
 Ascription of intelligence: When people of color are stereotyped to have a certain level of intelligence based on their race.
 E.g.: "You people always do well in school", or "If I see a lot of Asian students in my class, I know it's going to be a hard class”.
 Denial of racial reality: When people  emphasize that a person of color does not suffer from racial discrimination or inequality (this correlates to the idea of model minority).
 Exoticization of non-white women: When non-white women are stereotyped as being in the "exotic" category based on gender, appearance, and media expectations. 
 E.g.: Descriptions of an Asian-American woman as a ‘Dragon Lady’, ‘Tiger Mom’, or ‘Lotus Blossom’, or using symbols associated with Eastern cultures.
 Refusal to acknowledge intra-ethnic differences: When a speaker ignores intra-ethnic differences and assumes a broad homogeneity over multiple ethnic groups.
 E.g.: Descriptions such as "all Asian-Americans look alike", or assumptions that all members of an ethnic minority speak the same language or have the same cultural values.
 Pathologizing cultural values/communication styles: When Asian American culture and values are viewed as less desirable.
 E.g.: Viewing the valuation of silence (a cultural norm present in some Asian communities) as a fault, leading to disadvantages caused by the expectation of verbal participation common in many Western academic settings.
 Second-class citizenship: When minorities are treated as lesser human beings, or are not treated with equal rights or priority.
 E.g.: A Korean man asking for a drink in a bar being ignored by the bartender, or the bartender choosing to serve a white man before serving the Korean man.
 Invisibility: Asian-Americans are considered invisible or outside discussions of race and racism. 
 E.g.: Discussions on race in the United States excluding Asian-Americans by focussing only on ‘white and black’ issues.

In a 2017 peer-reviewed review of the literature, Scott Lilienfeld critiqued microaggression research for hardly having advanced beyond taxonomies such as the above, which was proposed by Sue nearly ten years earlier. While acknowledging the reality of "subtle slights and insults directed toward minorities", Lilienfeld concluded that the concept and programs for its scientific assessment are "far too underdeveloped on the conceptual and methodological fronts to warrant real-world application". He recommended abandonment of the term microaggression since "the use of the root word 'aggression' in 'microaggression' is conceptually confusing and misleading". In addition, he called for a moratorium on microaggression training programs until further research can develop the field.

In 2017 Althea Nagai, who works as a research fellow at the conservative Center for Equal Opportunity, published an article in the National Association of Scholars journal Academic Questions, criticizing microaggression research as pseudoscience. Nagai said that the prominent critical race researchers behind microaggression theory "reject the methodology and standards of modern science." She lists various technical shortcomings of microaggression research, including "biased interview questions, reliance on narrative and small numbers of respondents, problems of reliability, issues of replicability, and ignoring alternative explanations."

Race or ethnicity 

Social scientists Sue, Bucceri, Lin, Nadal, and Torino (2007) described microaggressions as "the new face of racism", saying that the nature of racism has shifted over time from overt expressions of racial hatred and hate crimes, toward expressions of aversive racism, such as microaggressions, that are more subtle, ambiguous, and often unintentional. Sue says this has led some Americans to believe wrongly that non-white Americans no longer suffer from racism. One example of such subtle expressions of racism is Asian students being either pathologized or penalized as too passive or quiet. An incident that caused controversy at UCLA occurred when a teacher corrected a student's use of "indigenous" in a paper by changing it from upper- to lowercase.

According to Sue et al., microaggressions seem to appear in three forms:
 Microassault: an explicit racial derogation; verbal/nonverbal; e.g. name-calling, avoidant behavior, purposeful discriminatory actions.
 Microinsult: communications that convey rudeness and insensitivity and demean a person's racial heritage or identity; subtle snubs; unknown to the perpetrator; hidden insulting message to the recipient.
 Microinvalidation: communications that exclude, negate, or nullify the psychological thoughts, feelings, or experiential reality of a person belonging to a particular group.

Some psychologists have criticized microaggression theory for assuming that all verbal, behavioral, or environmental indignities are due to bias. Thomas Schacht says that it is uncertain whether a behavior is due to racial bias or is a larger phenomenon that occurs regardless of identity conflict. However, Kanter and colleagues found that microaggressions were robustly correlated to five separate measures of bias. In reviewing the microaggression literature, Scott Lilienfeld suggested that microassaults should probably be struck from the taxonomy because the examples provided in the literature tend not to be "micro", but are outright assaults, intimidation, harassment and bigotry; in some cases, examples have included criminal acts. Others have pointed out that what could be perceived as subtle snubs could be due to people having conditions such as autism or social anxiety disorders, and assuming ill will could be harmful to these people.

Gender 
 
Explicit sexism in society is on the decline, but still exists in a variety of subtle and non-subtle expressions. Women encounter microaggressions in which they are made to feel inferior, sexually objectified, and bound to restrictive gender roles, both in the workplace and in academia, as well as in athletics. Microaggressions based on gender are applied to female athletes when their abilities are compared only to men, when they are judged on "attractiveness", and when they are restricted to "feminine" or sexually attractive attire during competition.

Other examples of sexist microaggressions are "[addressing someone by using] a sexist name, a man refusing to wash dishes because it is 'women's work,' displaying nude pin-ups of women at places of employment, someone making unwanted sexual advances toward another person".

Makin and Morczek also use the term gendered microaggression to refer to male interest in violent rape pornography.

Sociologists Sonny Nordmarken and Reese Kelly (2014) identified trans-specific microaggressions that transgender people face in healthcare settings, which include pathologization, sexualization, rejection, invalidation, exposure, isolation, intrusion, and coercion.

Sexuality and sexual orientation 

In focus groups, individuals identifying as bisexual report such microaggressions as others denying or dismissing their self-narratives or identity claims, being unable to understand or accept bisexuality as a possibility, pressuring them to change their bisexual identity, expecting them to be sexually promiscuous, and questioning their ability to maintain monogamous relationships.

Some LGBTQ individuals report receiving expressions of microaggression from people even within the LGBTQ community. They say that being excluded, or not being made welcome or understood within the gay and lesbian community is a microaggression. Roffee and Waling suggest that the issue arises, as occurs among many groups of people, because a person often makes assumptions based on individual experience, and when they communicate such assumptions, the recipient may feel that it lacks taking the second individual into account and is a form of microaggression.

Intersectionality 

People who are members of overlapping marginal groups (e.g., a gay Asian American man or a trans woman) experience microaggressions based in correspondingly varied forms of marginalization.
For example, in one study Asian American women reported feeling they were classified as sexually exotic by majority-culture men or were viewed by them as potential trophy wives simply because of their group membership. African American women report microaggressions related to characteristics of their hair, which may include invasion of personal space as an individual tries to touch it, or comments that a style that is different from that of a European American woman looks "unprofessional".

People with mental illnesses 

People with mental illness report receiving more overt forms of microaggression than subtle ones, coming from family and friends as well as from authority figures. In a study involving college students and adults who were being treated in community care, five themes were identified: invalidation, assumption of inferiority, fear of mental illness, shaming of mental illness, and being treated as a second-class citizen. Invalidation would occur, for example, when friends and family members minimized mental health symptoms; one participant described others claiming "You can't be depressed, you're smiling." People would sometimes falsely assume that mental illness means lower intelligence; a participant reported that the hospital staff in a psych ward were speaking to mentally ill patients as if they could not understand instructions.

Disability 
People with physical disabilities also face microaggressions, such as 
 the misconception that those with disabilities want or require correction
 asking inappropriate questions

Media 
Members of marginalized groups have also described microaggressions committed by performers or artists associated with various forms of media, such as television, film, photography, music, and books. Some researchers believe that such cultural content reflects but also molds society, allowing for unintentional bias to be absorbed by individuals based on their media consumption, as if it were expressed by someone with whom they had an encounter.

A study of racism in TV commercials describes microaggressions as gaining a cumulative weight, leading to inevitable clashes between races due to subtleties in the content. As an example of a racial microaggression, or microassault, this research found that black people were more likely than white counterparts to be shown eating or participating in physical activity, and more likely to be shown working for, or serving others. The research concludes by suggesting that microaggressive representations can be omitted from a body of work, without sacrificing creativity or profit.

Pérez Huber and Solorzano start their analysis of microaggressions with an anecdote about Mexican "bandits" as portrayed in a children's book read at bedtime. The article gives examples of negative stereotypes of Mexicans and Latinos in books, print, and photos, associating them with the state of racial discourse within majority culture and its dominance over minority groups in the US. The personification of these attitudes through media can also be applied to microaggressive behaviors towards other marginalized groups.

A 2015 review of the portrayal of LGBT characters in film  says that gay or lesbian characters are presented in "offensive" ways. In contrast, LGBT characters portrayed as complex characters who are more than a cipher for their sexual orientation or identity are a step in the right direction. Ideally, "queer film audiences finally have a narrative pleasure that has been afforded to straight viewers since the dawn of film noir: a central character who is highly problematical, but fascinating."

Ageism and intolerance 
Microaggression can target and marginalize any definable group, including those who share an age grouping or belief system. Microaggression is a manifestation of bullying that employs microlinguistic power plays in order to marginalize any target with a subtle manifestation of intolerance by signifying the concept of "other".

Perpetrators 
Because microaggressions are subtle and perpetrators may be unaware of the harm they cause, the recipients often experience attributional ambiguity, which may lead them to dismiss the event and blame themselves as overly sensitive to the encounter.

If challenged by the minority person or an observer, perpetrators will often defend their microaggression as a misunderstanding, a joke, or something small that should not be blown out of proportion.

A 2020 study involving American college students found a correlation between likelihood to commit microaggressions, and racial bias.

Effects 
A 2013 scholarly review of the literature on microaggressions concluded that "the negative impact of racial microaggressions on psychological and physical health is beginning to be documented; however, these studies have been largely correlational and based on recall and self-report, making it difficult to determine whether racial microaggressions actually cause negative health outcomes and, if so, through what mechanisms". A 2017 review of microaggression research argued that that as scholars try to understand the possible harm caused by microaggressions, they have not conducted much cognitive or behavioral research, nor much experimental testing, and they have overly relied on small collections of anecdotal testimonies from samples who are not representative of any particular population. These assertions were later argued against in that same journal in 2020, but the response was criticized for failing to address the findings of the systematic reviews and continuing to draw causal inferences from correlational data.

Recipients of microaggressions may feel anger, frustration, or exhaustion. African Americans have reported feeling under pressure to "represent" their group or to suppress their own cultural expression and "act white". Over time, the cumulative effect of microaggressions is thought by some to lead to diminished self-confidence and a poor self-image for individuals, and potentially also to such mental-health problems as depression, anxiety, and trauma. Many researchers have argued that microaggressions are more damaging than overt expressions of bigotry precisely because they are small and therefore often ignored or downplayed, leading the victim to feel self-doubt for noticing or reacting to the encounter, rather than justifiable anger, and isolation rather than support from others about such incidents. Studies have found that in the U.S. when people of color perceived microaggressions from mental health professionals, client satisfaction with therapy is lower.
Some studies suggest that microaggressions represent enough of a burden that some people of color may fear, distrust, and/or avoid relationships with white people in order to evade such interaction. On the other hand, some people report that dealing with microaggressions has made them more resilient. Scholars have suggested that, although microaggressions "might seem minor", they are "so numerous that trying to function in such a setting is 'like lifting a ton of feathers.

An ethnographic study of transgender people in healthcare settings observed that participants sometimes responded to microaggressions by leaving a hospital in the middle of treatment, and never returning to a formal healthcare setting again.

Criticism

Public discourse and harm to speakers 

Kenneth R. Thomas wrote in American Psychologist that recommendations inspired by microaggression theory, if "implemented, could have a chilling effect on free speech and on the willingness of White people, including some psychologists, to interact with people of color." Sociologists Bradley Campbell and Jason Manning have written in the academic journal Comparative Sociology that the microaggression concept "fits into a larger class of conflict tactics in which the aggrieved seek to attract and mobilize the support of third parties" that sometimes involves "building a case for action by documenting, exaggerating, or even falsifying offenses". The concept of microaggressions has been described as a symptom of the breakdown in civil discourse, and that microaggressions are "yesterday's well-meaning faux pas".

One suggested type of microaggression by an Oxford University newsletter was avoiding eye contact or not speaking directly to people. This spurred a controversy in 2017 when it was pointed out that such assumptions are insensitive to autistic people who may have trouble making eye contact.

Culture of victimhood 
In their article "Microaggression and Moral Cultures", sociologists Bradley Campbell and Jason Manning say that the discourse of microaggression leads to a culture of victimhood. Social psychologist Jonathan Haidt states that this culture of victimhood lessens an individual's "ability to handle small interpersonal matters on one's own" and "creates a society of constant and intense moral conflict as people compete for status as victims or as defenders of victims". Similarly, the linguist and social commentator John McWhorter says that "it infantilizes black people to be taught that microaggressions, and even ones a tad more macro, hold us back, permanently damage our psychology, or render us exempt from genuine competition." McWhorter does not disagree that microaggressions exist. However, he worries that too much societal focus on microaggressions will cause other problems and has stated that the term should be confined to "when people belittle us on the basis of stereotypes."

Emotional distress 
In The Atlantic, Greg Lukianoff and Jonathan Haidt expressed concern that the focus on microaggressions can cause more emotional trauma than the experience of the microaggressions at the time of occurrence. They believe that self-policing by an individual of thoughts or actions in order to avoid committing microaggressions may cause emotional harm as a person seeks to avoid becoming a microaggressor, as such extreme self-policing may share some characteristics of pathological thinking. Referring especially to prevention programs at schools or universities, they say that the element of protectiveness, of which identifying microaggression allegations are a part, prepares students "poorly for professional life, which often demands intellectual engagement with people and ideas one might find uncongenial or wrong". They also said that it has become "unacceptable to question the reasonableness (let alone the sincerity) of someone's emotional state", resulting in adjudication of alleged microaggressions having characteristics of witch trials.

Amitai Etzioni, writing in The Atlantic, suggested that attention to microaggressions distracts individuals and groups from dealing with much more serious acts.

Political correctness 
Viv Regan, writing for Spiked Online, wondered whether the comfort provided by having a convenient label for alleged rudeness outweighs the damage caused by overreaction.

According to Derald Wing Sue, whose works popularized the term, many critiques are based on the term being misunderstood or misused. He said that his purpose in identifying such comments or actions was to educate people and not to silence or shame them. He further notes that, for instance, identifying that someone has used racial microaggressions is not intended to imply that they are racist.

Mind reading 
According to Lilienfeld, a possible harmful effect of microaggression programs is to increase an individual's tendency to over-interpret the words of others in a negative way. Lilienfeld refers to this as mind reading, "in which individuals assume—without attempts at verification—that others are reacting negatively to them.... For example, Sue et al...regarded the question 'Where were you born?' directed at Asian Americans as a microaggression."

The Search for Common Ground 
In a 2019 journal article, Scott Lilienfeld, who is a critic of microaggression theory, titled a section: "The Search for Common Ground."  Lilienfeld agrees that "a discussion of microaggressions, however we choose to conceptualize them, may indeed have a place on college campuses and businesses." In such conversations, Lilienfeld states it is important to assume "most or all individuals…were genuinely offended," "to listen nondefensively to their concerns and reactions," and to "be open to the possibility that we have been inadvertently insensitive."

In his latest book, D.W. Sue, who popularized the term microaggression, also recommends a "collaborative rather than an attacking tone."

See also 
 Anti-LGBT rhetoric
 Bullying
 Cancel culture – ostracizing people for non-conformance to a value
 Covert racism
 Chauvinism – preference for people like oneself
 Cultural conflict
 Etiquette
 Ethnocentrism
 Hostile attribution bias – interpreting ambiguous interactions in a negative light
 Intercultural communication
 Intersectionality – interplay of multiple attributes 
 Ideas of reference and delusions of reference – uncommon psychiatric symptom
 LGBT stereotypes
 Micro-inequity – less race-focused understanding of microaggression
 Nitpicking – complaining about small problems
 Occupational sexism – sexism in the workplace
 Political correctness – pejorative term for less offensive language
 Rankism – catch-all term for exploiting people perceived to have lower status
 Safe-space – place intended to be free of microagressions for a group
 Stereotype threat 
 Trigger warning – intended to prevent flashbacks in trauma survivors
 White privilege

References 

Aggression
Discrimination
Racism
Race-related controversies
African-American-related controversies
Linguistic controversies
Social psychology concepts
Social sciences terminology
Interpersonal communication
1970s neologisms